Captain Roberto Curilovic is a former Argentinian Navy pilot. His attack on 25 May 1982 in the Falklands War sank the transport ship Atlantic Conveyor with an Exocet AM.39 anti-ship missile.

Career
He finished his naval training at the Escuela Naval Militar (República Argentina) in 1969, flying the North American T-28 Trojan.

In September 1980, he went with eight pilots and around forty technicians of the 2da Escuadrilla Aeronaval de Caza y Ataque (2nd Air Naval Fighter and Strike Squadron) to the naval base at Rochefort, Charente-Maritime in south-west France (Poitou-Charentes). They were intensively taught French for three months. The commander was Commander (Capitán de Fragata) Jorge Colombo of the Argentine Naval Aviation (CANA). The deputy commander was Lieutenant Commander (Capitán de Corbeta) Augusto Bedacarratz, who with Lieutenant Junior Grade (Teniente de Fragata) Armando Mayora would also jointly use the Exocet.

They were sent to the air naval base at Landivisiau in Finistère, north-west France where they then learnt how to fly the AMD-BA Super Étendard, being given up to 50 hours of flight training each. They were also taught about the Aérospatiale AM.39 Exocet missile. The missile was named after the biological family Exocoetidae.

In July 1981, the unit returned to the Comandante Espora air naval base (Base Aeronaval Comandante Espora) in Argentina. The Argentine Navy had ordered 14 Super Étendard aircraft, and the first five arrived in December 1981. The navy had also ordered 14 air-to-surface Exocet missiles in 1979.

Falklands War
On 2 April 1982, the Argentines invaded the Falkland Islands. The Argentine Navy had not yet received a visit by a French technical team to put the Exocet missiles into operational status, and there was little hope of that happening when the French immediately put a weapons embargo on Argentina. However, two weeks later, the 2nd Squadron's technicians had worked out how to connect the missiles to the aircraft. The Argentine Navy (Armada de la República Argentina) had bought two Type 42 destroyers - the ARA Hércules and the ARA Santísima Trinidad - to practise against, which both also carried the MM-38 version of the Exocet. In late April, the squadron moved from Espora to Rio Grande.

At the time of the Falklands War, his rank was Capitán de Corbeta, which is equivalent to a Royal Navy lieutenant commander or a Royal Air Force squadron leader.

Attack on the Atlantic Conveyor
The Argentines had problems with spare parts for their airborne radar aircraft, which were effectively grounded on 15 May 1982. In their place, the AN/TPS-43 three-dimensional radar and an AN/TPS-44 radar were used from the Falkland Islands. On 25 May, the Atlantic Conveyor was spotted by the radar 110 miles north-east of the Falklands. At 7:30 am, this information was passed to the naval air base at Rio Grande (now Hermes Quijada International Airport) on the Tierra del Fuego.

His plane, the Super Étendard 0753/3-A-203, was readied for a 9:00 am mission, but a KC-130H tanker was not available in time. After leaving the KC-130H, the two pilots headed  to the south-east. At 150 miles from the target, both planes dropped to 10 metres above the sea surface. The ship caught fire and sank three days later while under tow. Both planes travelled  in the operation in 3 hours and 50 minutes. Argentina had two tanker aircraft available. Both planes returned to Puerto Deseado. Only HMS Ambuscade had picked up the planes on its radar. After the operation, the Argentines had one operational Exocet left.

Curilovic was awarded the Medal of Valour in Combat (La Nación Argentina al Valor en Combate) in 1984. He received the Naval Merit Order (Al Mérito Naval) in 1987 from the Brazilian Navy (Marinha do Brasil).

On 16 August 2011, he gave a talk at the Centro de Graduados del Liceo Naval Militar (Naval Military Lyceum Graduate Centre) entitled SuperEtendard Squadron, a nightmare for the British fleet (Spanish: Escuadrilla de SuperEtendard, una pesadilla para la flota británica).

Personal life

He married in 1970. Curilovic is of Croatian descent.

See also
 Weapons of the Falklands War
 Argentine air forces in the Falklands War
 Pablo Carballo

References

External links
 Britains Small Wars
 Naval attack (Spanish)

Video clips
 Exocet missile

Argentine people of Ukrainian descent
Argentine military personnel of the Falklands War
Argentine Naval Aviation
Argentine Navy officers
Argentine aviators
Falklands War pilots
Living people
Year of birth missing (living people)